The 1952–53 FAW Welsh Cup is the 66th season of the annual knockout tournament for competitive football teams in Wales.

Key
League name pointed after clubs name.
CCL - Cheshire County League
FL D1 - Football League First Division
FL D3N - Football League Third Division North
SFL - Southern Football League
WLN - Welsh League North

Fifth round
Eight winners from the Fourth round and ten new clubs.

Sixth round
Three winners from the Fifth round plus Pwllheli & District. Six clubs get a bye to the Seventh round.

Seventh round

Semifinal
Chester and Connah's Quay Nomads played at Wrexham.

Final
Final were held at Bangor.

External links
The FAW Welsh Cup

1952-53
Wales
Cup